Champagne Charlie is a 1989 French-Canadian dramatic television miniseries, directed by Allan Eastman and starring Hugh Grant, Megan Gallagher, Megan Follows and Béatrice Agenin. It is based on the novel by Jacqueline Lefèvre and depicts the life of the nineteenth century wine merchant Charles Heidsieck.

It had a budget of $7 million. Hugh Grant said "I play the archetypal hero. I hit people in the face, I rescue pretty girls. They fall in love with me. I'm a man, I'm charming. All the things I wanted to be. It's a very nice role, really."

Cast

 Hugh Grant : Charles Heidsieck
 Megan Gallagher : Pauline
 Megan Follows : Louise Heidsick
 Stéphane Audran : Thérèse
 Georges Descrières : Pierre-Henri
 Jean-Claude Dauphin : Ernest
 Alexandra Stewart : Cécile
 Vladek Sheybal : Count Plasky
 R. H. Thomson : Robert Morgan
 Kenneth Welsh : John Whistlow
 August Schellenberg : General Butler
 Denis Forest : Paul Lampin
 Chas Lawther : David McLeod
 Hagan Beggs : Tom McLeod
 Vlasta Vrána : Hawkins
 Tom Rack : Abraham Lincoln
 Béatrice Agenin : Madame de Ghuilain
 Pier Paolo Capponi : Consul de Ghuilain

References

External links

Television shows filmed in Montreal
Films directed by Allan Eastman
1980s Canadian television miniseries
CTV Television Network original programming
1989 in Canadian television
1989 television films
English-language Canadian films
English-language French films